The Progress Singapore Party (abbreviation: PSP) is an opposition political party in Singapore and is one of the three contemporary political parties represented in Parliament, alongside the governing People's Action Party (PAP) and opposition Workers' Party (WP).

History

The party was founded in 2019 by Tan Cheng Bock and 11 other members. They, together with Lee Hsien Yang, expressed that the current PAP leadership has "lost its way" and deviated from the founding principles of its founding fathers.

The party was officially registered on 28 March 2019 after being approved by the Registry of Societies. The initial formation included 12 members, including some former People's Action Party's politicians. Party founder Tan Cheng Bock explained that the forming of the political party was a result of an erosion of good governance in terms of transparency, independence and accountability. The party also cited ensuring accountability from the People's Action Party and job creation as their main focus. Tan had previously contested the 2011 presidential election, in which he won 34.85% of the popular vote but lost by a small margin of 7,269 votes to former deputy prime minister Tony Tan.

An event to commemorate the party's launch was planned at the Singapore Expo on 15 June, but police permits required for the event were not approved in time. The event was postponed to 3 August and was re-located to the Swissotel Merchant Court Hotel, attracting an audience of 1,000 people. The event was also live-streamed to twenty-five thousand viewers online.

During 2019, on 10 September, the PSP launched an event series called "PSP Talks", in which party members invited thought leaders and subject matter experts to share their insights and ideas on important national issues and policies. The first forum was conducted on 10 September and ex-GIC chief economist Yeoh Kam Leong was invited to speak about poverty in Singapore and the policy gaps in Singapore's social safety nets.

The second PSP Talks forum was held on 19 December. Veteran architect Tay Kheng Soon was invited to speak on "Politics and Planning: The Future of Singapore". He discussed some of the problems Singapore faced, such as how meritocracy has devolved into elitism and the obsolete town planning system. He also talked about the possibility of Singapore having five different elections for five local governments, each governing a Community Development Council and a central government elected from the five local governments.

On 19 October 2019, Tan led party members, volunteers and members of the public to blood banks for a PSP community blood donation drive called "Giving The Gift of Life", citing a nationwide shortage of type O blood. Tan also encouraged Singaporeans to donate blood regularly.

On 17 January 2020, at its new year dinner, the party announced a reshuffling of leadership. Two central executive committee members (CEC) stepped down and five new members joined the party's CEC. Tan said "I am looking for a team to mentor, so many have stepped forward... PSP is now managed by a team. It is not just the Tan Cheng Bock party, it is the people's party." The party's theme song "March of Change" and party mascot "Otica" was also unveiled.

On 27 January, PSP officially opened its new headquarters at Bukit Timah Shopping Centre. Tan mentioned that the party intends to stay for the long haul and that the headquarters will host party talks and seminars.

On 1 May, potential candidate Daniel Teo was expelled from the party after a video he produced was leaked saying that the party had "been infiltrated and funded by foreign sources". The party denied this. Among the PSP members Teo accused was Ravi Philemon. Teo later admitted that the allegations made in his video are complete without foundation and acted in his own capacity. He apologised unreservedly to Philemon and other members named in the video. Philemon resigned from the party on 12 May, after he got the unreserved apology from Teo, but refused to elaborate on the reasons for the decision. In response to this incident and the departure of other PSP members, Tan said that "there are many waiting to join us" and it is not an issue for the party.

2020 Singaporean General Election

During the 2020 general election, the party garnered 48% of the votes in West Coast GRC, allowing them to claim 2 Non-constituency Member of Parliament (NCMP) seats in the 14th Parliament of Singapore.

Pre-election
On 29 September 2019, Tan led about 300 party members and volunteers in PSP's first official island-wide walkabout. The walkabout called "29 on 29" was conducted at 29 constituencies (16 Group Representative Constituencies and 13 Single Member Constituencies). PSP assistant secretary-general Anthony Lee said that the PSP sent out a friendly note as a form of courtesy to let the other opposition parties know of its walkabout plans and that the PSP will continue to work with other opposition parties and wishes to maintain a good relationship with them. Tan did not rule out the possibility of having an opposition coalition for the next General Election. Ravi Philemon (former Singapore People's Party's member) noted that Tan has been accepted as the leader of the opposition by the other opposition parties.

In October 2019, the party put out calls for volunteers to join the party as polling and counting agents, ahead of other political parties. The party regarded both play an important role in the electoral process.

On 4 November 2019, PSP called for an opposition alliance meeting which representatives from seven opposition political parties attended. It was a private meeting. According to Tan, the meeting was to discuss future plans and to get to the members of the various parties to get to know one another.

On 9 November 2019, Progress Singapore Party began its second island-wide walkabout. About 220 party members and volunteers took buses and trains to travel around the island.

On 12 January 2020, the party had their second door-to-door house visits at West Coast GRC which was led by Tan and joined by more than 200 members and volunteers. The event involved 22 teams and covered 50 residential blocks. A walkabout of about 40 members was also conducted in 2019 within the same GRC.

Pre-nomination day events
Lee Hsien Yang joined the PSP as a member on 24 June 2020, but did not contest in the forthcoming election, claiming that the PAP had "lost its way".

The Reform Party has accused the PSP for not living up to an agreement so that they could avoid a three-way fight with the PAP in Yio Chu Kang SMC. However, the PSP responded that no such agreement existed.

Final result
On 10 July 2020, despite posing strong challenges in among the nine constituencies and fielding the largest slate of candidates this election with 24, none of the contested seats ended up victorious; however, the seat that the party came closest to winning was West Coast GRC where Tan lead the team, being defeated by the ruling People's Action Party team led by Communications and Information minister S Iswaran in a 51.69%-48.31% of the votes. Due to being the best result among non-elect candidates and 10 opposition politicians having successfully been elected (Workers' Party winning Aljunied GRC, Hougang SMC and Sengkang GRC), they were entitled two seats for the Non-constituency Member of Parliament to fulfil the 12-opposition minimum. Their vote share was higher than the national average (38.76%), having garnered 40.86% of the votes based on the contested constituencies, and 10.18% based on the overall popular vote cast. Prior to the results, Tan earlier revealed that he will decline taking up the NCMP position calling it as a 'ploy', but allows decision to be made by the other team members. On 14 July, PSP revealed Hazel Poa and Leong Mun Wai as the two members who would be taking up the NCMP seats.

Post-Election
Hazel Poa and Leong Mun Wai stepped down as office bearers to focus on their NCMP duties. Both remained as CEC members and are involved in the party's activities. Francis Yuen took over as assistant general-secretary, while the vice-chairman post remained vacant.

Since then, PSP has formed its women's wing and youth wing to create more targeted policies helping these groups, headed by Tanjong Pagar GRC candidates Wendy Low and Terence Soon respectively. In addition, a Parliamentary Secretariat was formed to help the NCMPs with policy research for their duties, which is headed by both Leong Mun Wai and Hazel Poa. The women's wing was officially launched on 30 January 2021.

The PSP's CEC underwent a leadership renewal in March 2021; 11 CEC members stepped down and six new CEC members were elected. On 1 April 2021, PSP announced that Francis Yuen has taken over as the secretary-general of the party, with Tan Cheng Bock being the chairperson. Wang Swee Chuang hence became the vice-chairperson. Later on 26 April, youth wing head Terence Soon resigned citing career opportunities and family considerations, with newly elected member Jess Chua taking over three days later.

On 11 August 2021, party member Brad Bowyer resigned from the party after he made a post comparing differentiated measures for those vaccinated with the Holocaust, sparking controversy and condemnation including from the Israeli Embassy in Singapore. Bowyer has since stood by his views.

Following that, on 25 October 2021, treasurer and party member Kayla Low resigned from the Party citing frequent travelling requirements as part of her new career, although she would continue to volunteer with the Party. Party member Peggie Chua took over as the new treasurer. The following month, former party member Kala Manickam sued the party over claims of wrongful termination and seeks to have $10,000 reimbursed, to which the party leadership said there was no basis to the lawsuit, listing various events that led to her termination.

On 14 February 2022, Kumaran Pillai told party leaders he would step down from the positions of communications chief and party spokesman, taking a "leave of absence" for an unspecified period of time due to business ventures and health considerations, including a frozen shoulder sustained during a walkabout in the 2020 general election. Pillai will still be in the central executive committee, with Jonathan Tee taking over as the new communications chief, announced three days later.

Organisation

Central Executive Committee

List of Secretaries-General

List of Chairpersons

List of Vice-Chairpersons

List of former CEC Members

Current Members of Parliament

Leadership of Progress Singapore Party

Issues/proposals raised

Budget
In February 2020, PSP announced its first public policy proposal which includes: a) Broader relief package for businesses, b) Expansionary budget to tide through the current crises, c) Fiscal budget is not a goodie-bag, d) Building a sustainable economy, e) No to GST hike, f) Taxpayers should not be burdened for large infrastructure projects and g) A prudent approach to expenditures.

PSP welcomes the Government's immediate short-term relief to assist Singaporeans and local companies in light of the COVID-19 pandemic. The party also called for a more "broad-based" approach in helping the transport, retail, and food and beverage industries and conducting a review of the education system. The party is in favour of more permanent plans rather than short-term occasional handouts.

Climate change
On climate change, Tan Cheng Bock has suggested that government and government-linked companies should provide incentives for renewable energy usage.

Employment of foreign manpower
Tan Cheng Bock has promised to call for the review of the India–Singapore Comprehensive Economic Cooperation Agreement (CECA), one of the terms which allow the free movement of Indian professionals in 127 sectors to enter and work in Singapore.
He said that there is a need to ensure job priority for Singaporeans and CECA has brought a lot of unhappiness among Singaporean professionals, managers, executives and technicians (PMETs) who feel vulnerable in their jobs. He calls for the government to publish a balance sheet for CECA, to show how Singapore and Singaporeans have benefited from this agreement, how many local jobs have gone to Indian professionals and how many Singaporeans have gone to India.

According to the PSP's manifesto published for the 2020 Singaporean General Election, the PSP wishes to introduce a quota for the number of Employment Passes and to lower the quota for the number of S-Passes and Work Permits. The manifesto also states that the dependence on foreign labour in Singapore has caused problems such as congestion, social strains and depressed wages. By curbing what the PSP describes as the easy supply of foreign manpower, they hope to encourage employers to invest in equipment or processes for higher productivity.

Protection from Online Falsehoods and Manipulation Act (POFMA)

PSP issued a statement on POFMA, stating that the POFMA does not measure up to standards of transparency and accountability and when news involved the government, it also fails the standard of independence. The party views that POFMA should be the prerogative of the Courts of Singapore. The PSP's manifesto released for the 2020 Singaporean General Election states that POFMA should be reviewed.

Central Provident Fund
The PSP wants Medishield Life premiums to be paid for by the Government. They are currently paid for using Medisave.

Small and medium enterprises
The PSP wants to provide assistance to local SMEs by giving them priority in public sector procurements, investing in local SMEs and encouraging cooperation amongst them, direct support to them to restructure their businesses and expand overseas, and reducing business costs for them.

Taxes
In their manifesto for the 2020 Singapore General Election, the PSP stated that they wanted to freeze tax and fee increases until 2025.

Racial harmony
In response to a video by entertainer Preeti Nair (known by her moniker 'Preetipls' and her brother Subhas Nair) which lambasted the use of racial brownface in an advertisement, then-Central Executive Committee member Michelle Lee stated that although the siblings had used inappropriate language in their video, she found the police response in the aftermath to be 'high-handed' and 'harsh'. Lee acknowledged the video by the siblings reflected grievances that the minority races held in Singapore, and should not be ignored.

The unity of Singaporeans regardless of race, language or religion was one of the principles which the PSP said guided their social policies in their 2020 manifesto.

Voting age
During the party launch ceremony, Michelle Lee called for the lowering of voting age from the current 21 to 18 in line with international standards. In her speech, she criticised the current government policy on voting age as being 'behind the times'.

Alternative voices in Parliament
The PSP's 2020 manifesto states that the over-dominance of the People's Action Party, which has consistently held over 90% of the seats in the Parliament of Singapore, should be reduced. They want stronger alternative voices in Parliament offering different views and suggestions. More alternative voices in Parliament is one of the PSP's priorities in political development stated in the manifesto.

Public housing
One of the PSP's priorities laid out in their 2020 manifesto was to address HDB lease decay. They hope to provide en-bloc redevelopment for all old HDB flats, peg new flat prices to income levels and bring down housing costs for young Singaporeans to make them free to pursue their entrepreneurial goals.

Income inequality
The PSP's 2020 manifesto states that they hope to reduce inequality and improve social mobility. It also states that they wish to exempt basic necessities from the Goods and Services Tax, which is a regressive tax that disproportionately affects the lower-income.

Other issues
Lee commented on the high ministerial salary keep ministers in their ivory towers which prompted them afraid to take risks, disagree or lose their jobs. The highest-paid minister earns approximately 43 times the average Singaporean and an entry-level minister earns half of that. The PSP's 2020 manifesto states that ministerial salaries should be cut and pegged to the median income. They believe this is a form of personal sacrifice.

Michelle Lee also pointed out that more Singaporean students are turned away from tertiary education and the government spends almost $130 million on foreign students' scholarships.

Electoral performance

See also 
 Elections in Singapore
 List of political parties in Singapore
 Politics of Singapore

References

External links 
 

Political parties in Singapore
Political parties established in 2019
2019 establishments in Singapore